Traveling on One Leg is a novel by Nobel Prize-winning author Herta Müller, published in German in 1989 by Rotbuch Verlag. An English translation was made available in 1998.

 The protagonist Irene is a German-speaking woman in her mid-thirties who has just emigrated from Romania to West Germany and starts living in Berlin in the second half of the 1980s. Traveling on One Leg explores the themes of exile, homeland, and identity, and the protagonist's unsuccessful acquaintance or relationship with three different men.

Irene seeks to escape her traumatisation by creating a collage from newspaper clippings. By the creative process she experiments on what a fluid subjectivity might feel like. Irene can only live in the here and now by denying that she wishes to understand her life and keep in control. So the collage's dynamics between design and serendipity attract her attention and provide some kind of consolation.

Published after Müller's emigration to Germany, it is cited in 2010's History of the Literary Cultures of East Central Europe, along with Der Teufel sitzt im Spiegel and The Land of Green Plums, as drawing attention to her work in the West. The novel, one of several for which the author was known when winning the Nobel in 2009, was published in English in 1998 by Hydra Books/Northwestern University Press, translated by Valentina Glajar and André Lefevere.

Translations

 1990 Rejsende på et ben, translated into Danish by Nanna Thirup
 1991 Resande på ett ben, translated into Swedish by Karin Löfdahl
 1992 Reizigster op één been: roman, translated into Dutch by Gerda Meijerink
 1993 In viaggio su una gamba sola, translated into Italian by Lidia Castellani
 1993 Μετέωροι ταξιδιώτες, translated into Greek by Katerina Chatzē
 1998 Traveling on one leg, translated into English by Valentina Glajar and André Lefevere
 2010 Călătorie într-un picior, translated into Romanian by Corina Bernic
 2010 独腿旅行的人, together with Die Welt ist ein großer Fasan, translated into Chinese by Min Chen und Ni A
 2013 Tek bacaklı yolcu, translated into Turkish by Çağlar Tanyeri
 2015 Патничка на една нога, translated into Macedonian by Boban Zdravkovski Andreevski

Further reading
 Lyn Marven: „‹So fremd war das Gebilde›: The Interaction between Visual and Verbal in Herta Müller’s Prose and Collages“, in: Herta Müller, herausgegeben von Brigid Haines und Lyn Marven, Oxford University Press, Oxford 2013, pp. 135–152. Table of contents
 Moray McGowan: „‹Stadt und Schädel›, ‹Reisende›, and ‹Verlorene›. City, self, and survival in Herta Müller’s Reisende auf einem Bein“, in: Herta Müller, Oxford University Press, Oxford, 2013, pp. 64–83.
 Morwenna Symons: „Intertextual Inhabitations of the ‹Foreign›: Reisende auf einem Bein“, in: Room for Manoeuvre. The Role of Intertext in Elfriede Jelinek’s ‹Die Klavierspielerin', Günter Grass’s ‹Ein weites Feld›, and Herta Müller’s ‹Niederungen› and ‹Reisende auf einem Bein›. London, Maney Publishing, for the Modern Humanities Research Association and the Institute of Germanic and Romance Studies, University of London, 2005, pp. 133–155. Table of contents
 Brigid Haines und Margaret Littler: „Herta Müller, Reisende auf einem Bein (1989)“, in: Contemporary women’s writing in German. Changing the subject, Oxford University Press, Oxford 2004, pp. 99–117.
 Brigid Haines: „‹The unforgettable forgotten›. The traces of trauma in Herta Müller’s Reisende auf einem Bein“, in: German life and letters, 55 (2002), 3, pp. 266–281.
 Brigid Haines: „‹Leben wir im Detail›. Herta Müller’s micro-politics of resistance“, in: Herta Müller, herausgegeben von Brigid Haines, University of Wales Press, Cardiff 1998, pp. 109–125.

References

External links
 Readers' opinions on Traveling on One Leg, goodreads.com

1989 novels
Romania in fiction
Novels set in Germany
Works by Herta Müller